This list of wrongful convictions in the United States includes people who have been legally exonerated, including people whose convictions have been overturned or vacated, and who have not been retried because the charges were dismissed by the states. It also includes some historic cases of people who have not been formally exonerated (by a formal process such as has existed in the United States since the mid 20th century) but who historians believe are factually innocent. Generally, this means that research by historians has revealed original conditions of bias or extrajudicial actions that related to their convictions and/or executions.

Crime descriptions marked with an asterisk indicate that the events were later determined not to be criminal acts. People who were wrongfully accused are sometimes never released.

By February 2020, a total of 2,551 exonerations were mentioned in the National Registry of Exonerations. The total time these exonerated people spent in prison adds up to 22,540 years. Detailed data from 1989 regarding every known exoneration in the United States is listed. Data prior to 1989, however, is limited. By 2020, twenty individuals had been exonerated while on death row due to DNA evidence.

Before 1900

1900s

1910s

1920s

1930s

1940s

1950s

1960s

1970s

1980s

1990s

2000s

2010s

See also
 Capital punishment debate in the United States
 Capital punishment in the United States
 Exculpatory evidence
 False confession
 Innocence Project
 Innocent prisoner's dilemma
 List of exonerated death row inmates
 List of miscarriage of justice cases
 List of United States death row inmates
 List of women on death row in the United States
 Miscarriage of justice
 Overturned convictions in the United States
 Prosecutorial misconduct
 Race in the United States criminal justice system
 Wrongful executions in the United States
Maurice Hastings

References

Further reading
 Jed S. Rakoff, "Jailed by Bad Science", The New York Review of Books, vol. LXVI, no. 20 (19 December 2019), pp. 79–80, 85. According to Judge Rakoff (p. 85), "forensic techniques that in their origin were simply viewed as aids to police investigations have taken on an importance in the criminal justice system that they frequently cannot support. Their results are portrayed... as possessing a degree of validity and reliability that they simply do not have." Rakoff commends (p. 85) the U.S. National Academy of Sciences recommendation to "creat[e] an independent National Institute of Forensic Science to do the basic testing and promulgate the basic standards that would make forensic science much more genuinely scientific."

External links
 The National Registry of Exonerations
 Exoneration profiles at 

 
Trials in the United States
Abuse of the legal system
 
 
Recipients of American gubernatorial pardons